Kashyap Bandhu (March 1899 – 18 December 1985, born Tara Chand) was a political leader and social reformer in Kashmir.

Early political life
After some time he left the job and went to Lahore. He came under the influence of Arya Samaj and joined Vrjanand Ashram in Lahore.

Social reforms
In 1931, Bandhu returned to Kashmir. After return to Kashmir he along with Prem Nath Bazaz, Shiv Narain Fotedar, and Jia Lal Kilam organised a "Yuvak Sabha".

References

1899 births
1985 deaths
Kashmiri people
Jammu and Kashmir politicians
Indian social reformers
Arya Samajis
Activists from Jammu and Kashmir
20th-century Indian politicians